"The Beach" is a song by French recording duo Miss Kittin & The Hacker from their debut album First Album (2001). Produced by the duo, it was released as the album's fourth and final single in 2003.

Writing and inspiration
Lyrically, "The Beach" was written as a phone message from an old friend on vacation.

Composition
"The Beach" samples the 1983 song "I Want You" by Gary Low.

Critical reception
Patrick of Gullbuy commented that Miss Kittin is "no Donna Summer", yet "it's not overly disco and ends up being the more human side of that sound".

Music video
Andre Garça directed a music video for "The Beach".

Track listing
 "The Beach" – 4:41
 "Upstart" –

Charts

Song usage
"The Beach" was included on the compilation album Where Is Here by Mental Groove Records.

References

2001 songs
2003 singles
Miss Kittin songs
Songs written by Miss Kittin
Songs written by The Hacker
Songs about beaches